Hynhamia nigropunctana is a species of moth of the family Tortricidae. It is found in Ecuador.

The wingspan is about 19.5 mm. The ground colour of the forewings is cream, mixed with pale ferruginous. The markings are pale ferruginous. The hindwings are cream, tinged with ochreous in the apical area.

Etymology
The species name refers to the presence of a blackish brown spot in the subterminal area and is derived from Latin niger (meaning black).

References

Moths described in 2007
Hynhamia